Naseh Talkhah-e Zarguruk-e Sofla (also Romanized as Naseh Talkhah-e Zārgūrūk-e Soflá) is a village in Bahmayi-ye Sarhadi-ye Sharqi Rural District, Dishmok District, Kohgiluyeh County, Kohgiluyeh and Boyer-Ahmad Province, Iran. At the 2006 census, its population was 56, in 11 families.

References 

Populated places in Kohgiluyeh County